is a Japanese basketball player. He competed in the men's tournament at the 1972 Summer Olympics.

References

1947 births
Living people
Japanese men's basketball players
Olympic basketball players of Japan
Basketball players at the 1972 Summer Olympics
Place of birth missing (living people)
Asian Games medalists in basketball
Asian Games bronze medalists for Japan
Basketball players at the 1970 Asian Games
Medalists at the 1970 Asian Games